Škoda 35 T (also known as Škoda ForCity Classic Chemnitz) is a five carbody section low-floor bi-directional tram, developed by Škoda Transportation for Chemnitz. The low-floor area of the fully airconditioned tram represents 100% of the entire vehicle floor. Chemnitzer Verkehrs-Aktiengesellschaft ordered 14 units in June 2016. All trams were delivered from December 2018 to April 2020.

Vehicle design
The tram was designed by Czech company Aufeer Design from Mladá Boleslav. It consists five sections with three bogies. The doors are located both sides of the vehicle (5+5), the first and the last doors are smaller. The total capacity of the fully air conditioned car is 281 passengers.

References

External links 

Škoda trams